Shadow of Time is a studio album by Nightnoise. The album was released by Windham Hill Records (01934 11130-2) in 1993.

Track listing

Credits 

 Mícheál Ó Domhnaill – vocals, guitar, whistle, harmonium, synthesizer 
 Tríona Ní Dhomhnaill – vocals, piano, accordion, whistle, synthesizer, harmonium 
 Brian Dunning – flute, alto flute, whistle, vocals, synthesizer 
 Johnny Cunningham – fiddle 
 Dawn Atkinson – producer 
 Nightnoise – producer, arrangements (6,11)
 Bob Stark – recording engineer, mixing
 Bernie Grundman – mastering 
 Candace Upman – art direction 
 Sandy Del Rio – graphic design 
 Pam Gorelow – digitally editing and assembly
 Kate Power – artwork calligraphy 
 Thea Schrack – photography (cover) 
 Kevin Laubacher – photography (back cover)
 Al Evers – management 
 Judi Nudo – stylist 
 Recorded and mixed at White Horse Studios, Portland, OR, January–February 1993 
 Digitally edited and assembled at Windham Hill Records, Mill Valley, CA 
 Mastered at Bernie Grundman Mastering, Hollywood, CA

References 

1993 albums
Nightnoise albums